Eucalodiidae is a family of air-breathing land snails, terrestrial gastropod mollusks in the superfamily Urocoptoidea.

Genera 
Genera in the family Eucalodiidae include:
 Anisospira Strebel & Pfeffer, 1880
 Coelocentrum Crosse & P. Fischer, 1872
 † Condonella McLellan, 1927 
 Dissotropis Bartsch, 1906
 Eucalodium Crosse & P. Fischer, 1868
Genera brought into synonymy
 Liocentrum Pilsbry, 1902: synonym of Coelocentrum (Gymnocentrum) Pilsbry, 1942 represented as Coelocentrum Crosse & P. Fischer, 1872
 Thaumasia Albers, 1850: synonym of Eucalodium Crosse & P. Fischer, 1868

References

 Bank, R. A. (2017). Classification of the Recent terrestrial Gastropoda of the World. Last update: July 16th, 2017

 
Gastropod families